Multikillionaire: The Devil's Contract is the fourth album by Natas, released in 1997. This album is noted as the only album to feature Moebadis as the 4th member of the group.

Music and lyrics 

Allrovi wrote that the musical style of Multikillionaire: The Devil's Contract is a fusion of "Funkadelic guitar funk and Def Jam-era Rick Rubin-influenced beats". Regarding the album's lyrical content, Allrovi wrote "the group doesn't rely so much on perverse sex, morbid obsessions, or heretical talk but rather attitude here to make their music interesting."

Reception 

Allrovi reviewer Jason Birchmeier wrote that "This album isn't as realized as WWW.COM, but it's closer than any preceding Natas album."

Track listing

References 

1997 albums
Albums produced by Esham
Natas (group) albums
Reel Life Productions albums